Thomas Ehricht (born 1940) is a German composer, music educator and dramaturge.

Life 
Born in Halle (Saale), Ehricht studied school music at the Hochschule für Musik Franz Liszt, Weimar from 1959 to 1963. He then worked as a music teacher in Stralsund. In 1981, he was awarded the Hanns Eisler Prize. From 1982 to 1988, he worked as a dramaturge at the Theatre of West Pomerania. From 1988 to 2005, he was a lecturer in composition and ear training at the Hochschule für Musik und Theater Rostock.

He composed several pieces, including an opera.

Work 
 Kassandra (opera)
 Canzona for viola and piano
 Concertino for piano and orchestra.
 Siebengesang for voice and chamber ensemble.
 Marionettes for alto recorder and piano.
 Variations on Jesu, meine Freude for organ

Filmography 
 1981: David und Goliath

References

External links 
 

German composers
20th-century classical composers
German opera composers
German music educators
Dramaturges
1940 births
Living people
People from Halle (Saale)